"Not Like You" is a song by German recording artist Alexander Klaws. It was written by Nick Jarl, Alexander Kronlund, Kurt49 and produced by the former for Klaws's third studio album Attention! (2006).

Formats and track listings

Charts

References

External links
  
 

2006 singles
2006 songs
Alexander Klaws songs
Songs written by Alexander Kronlund
Hansa Records singles
Songs written by Nick Jarl